Al - Hazannah is a District area in the city of Sharjah, United Arab Emirates bordered by the Al-Qadisiya, Al-Jazzat, Al-Sabkha, and Al-Mansura Districts.

Sharjah (city)